The Tigoda is a river in Novgorodsky and Chudovsky Districts of Novgorod Oblast and Tosnensky and Kirishsky Districts of Leningrad Oblast in Russia. It is a left tributary of the Volkhov. The main tributaries are the Ravan (right), the Chagoda (left), and the Kusinka (left). The town of Lyuban is located on the banks of the Tigoda.

The river flows northeast and crosses into Tosnensky District of Leningrad Oblast. North of Lyuban it sharply turns south, accepts the Ravan from the right and crosses into Novgorod Oblast. There, it turns east, crosses into Kirishsky District of Leningrad Oblast and accepts the Chagoda from the left. Further east, a short stretch of the Tigoda makes a border between Leningrad and Novgorod Oblasts.

The drainage basin of the Tigoda includes the southeastern part of Tosnensky District, the western part of Kirishsky District, as well as minor areas in the north of Novgorodsky District, the northwest of Chudovsky District, and the south of Kirovsky District.

References

Rivers of Leningrad Oblast
Rivers of Novgorod Oblast